Line 3 of the Hangzhou Metro is a metro line in Hangzhou. It will run in a southwest-northeast direction between Wushanqiancun station in Yuhang District and Xingqiao station in Linping District in the east, passing through downtown Hangzhou and providing transfers with multiple other lines in the system. The line uses 6-car Type AH rolling stock, which is designed for exclusive use in Hangzhou.

Opening timeline
The initial section of the line, from Xingqiao to Chaowang Road was opened to public on 21 February 2022, and the remaining section from Chaowang Road to West Wenyi Road and the branch from South Xixi Wetland to Shima was opened on 10 June 2022. The Northern extension from West Wenyi Road to Wushanqiancun was opened on 22 September 2022.

Service routes
 Wushanqiancun — Xingqiao
 Shima — Xingqiao

Stations

Legend
 - Operational
 - Under construction

See also
 Hangzhou Metro

References

03
Railway lines opened in 2022
2022 establishments in China
Standard gauge railways in China